The 1948 Tipperary Senior Hurling Championship was the 58th staging of the Tipperary Senior Hurling Championship since its establishment by the Tipperary County Board in 1887.

Carrick Swans were the defending champions.

Holycross-Ballycahill won the championship after a 4-10 to 2-04 defeat of Lorrha in the final. It was their first ever championship title.

References

Tipperary
Tipperary Senior Hurling Championship